Marianna Denhoff  (1685–1730) was a German-Polish aristocrat. She replaced Anna Constantia von Brockdorff as the official royal mistress of Augustus II the Strong in 1713 and was succeeded by in Erdmuta Zofia von Dieskau 1719. She was politically active and cooperated with the French ambassador to persuade the king in favor of a Pro-French policy.

References

 Historia Dyplomacji Polskiej, tom II 1572-1795 pod red. Zbigniewa Wójcika, PWN Warszawa 1982, s. 433-434.

Mistresses of Augustus the Strong
18th-century Polish nobility
1685 births
1730 deaths
18th-century Polish women
Marianna